Silli-Adad ruled the ancient Near East city-state
of Larsa from 1771 BC to 1770 BC. His reign was less than a full year;

 the annals state that he was "removed from kingship" and "was no longer king". His successor was Warad-Sin.

See also

Chronology of the ancient Near East

Notes

External links
Silli-Adad Year Names at CDLI

Amorite kings
18th-century BC Sumerian kings
Kings of Larsa
18th-century BC people